Jach'a Kunturiri (Aymara jach'a big, kunturi condor, -ri a suffix, Hispanicized spelling Jachcha Condoriri) is a  mountain in the Andes of Bolivia. It is  situated in the Oruro Department, Sajama Province, Curahuara de Carangas Municipality, Sajama Canton, near the border to the La Paz Department. Jach'a Kunturi lies north-east of the mountains Kunturiri and Jisk'a Kunturiri and north-west of the extinct Sajama volcano.

See also
 Ch'iyar Quta
 Laram Q'awa 
 Sajama National Park
 List of mountains in the Andes

References 

Mountains of Oruro Department